Scania odontoclasper is a moth of the family Noctuidae. It is found in the Maule, Araucanía and Los Lagos Regions of Chile.

The wingspan is about 34 mm. Adults are on wing from January to February.

External links
 Noctuinae of Chile

Noctuinae
Endemic fauna of Chile